3-Hydroxyaspartic acid (three letter abbreviation: Hya) also known as beta-hydroxyaspartic acid is derivative of aspartic acid which has been hydroxylated at position-3. The adjacent image shows L-threo-3-Hydroxyaspartate. The Hya amino acid residue is sometimes contained in EGF-like domains such as Vitamin K-dependent coagulation plasma proteins including protein C.

See also 
 Epidermal growth factor (EGF)
 Vitamin K-dependent protein

References 

Acidic amino acids
Dicarboxylic acids
Alpha hydroxy acids